Psychoides verhuella is a moth of the family Tineidae found in Europe. It was first described in 1853, by Charles Théophile Bruand d'Uzelle from a specimen from Besançon, France. It is the type species of the genus Psychoides, also raised by Charles Bruand in 1853. The larvae feed on ferns.

Life cycle

Larva

Larvae feed from August to June, initially in a whitish mine in the frond, and in the spring they leave the mine and burrow into a sorus, feeding on the sporangia. They later form a loose, portable case from empty sporangia and when fully grown in May the case resembles a misplaced sorus, especially on hart's-tongue fern (Asplenium scolopendrium). The larva is yellowish white with a brownish dorsa line and has a black head and black prothoracic plate.

The following ferns have been recorded as food plants,

 rustyback (Asplenium ceterach)
 wall-rue (Asplenium ruta-muraria)
 hart's-tongue fern (Asplenium scolopendrium)
 maidenhair spleenwort (Asplenium trichomanes)  
 bracken (Pteridium aquilinum)

Larva of another moth, Psychoides filicivora also feed on ferns. It has a pale-brown head and a pale-brown posterial margin, which has a split in the middle, compared with the black head and prothoracic plate of Psychoides verhuella.

Pupa
In a larval case, which is often against the midrib of the food plant. Can be found in May and June.

Imago
Single brooded, the moth flies in June and July, in early morning and late afternoon sunshine. Occasionally comes to light. The grey to dark grey monochrome forewings have a violet reflection and lack the white tornal spot of Psychoides filicivora. The antennae are wire-shaped and just over half as long as the front wings.

Distribution
Found in Europe, this species has been recorded from the following countries and regions; Austria, Belgium, Channel Islands, Czech Republic, Germany, Great Britain (local distribution), Hungary, Ireland, Poland and Romania.

Etymology
Psychoides was raised by Charles Braund in 1853 and comes from psukhē – of the soul, i.e. a moth of the family Psychidae and eidos – form, that is from the similarity of this species to moths of the Psychidae. The specific name verhuella is in honour of the mid-19th century Dutch entomologist, Q M R Verhuell.

References

Bibliography

External links
 Lepiforum de

Tineidae
Leaf miners
Moths described in 1853
Moths of Europe
Taxa named by Charles Théophile Bruand d'Uzelle